Nadine Flora Gasman Zylbermann is the president of the National Women's Institute of Mexico, and the representative of UN Women in Brazil.

Early life 
Gasman was born in Mexico.

Gasman's education includes:
 Doctor of Public Health from Johns Hopkins University
 Master of Public Health from Harvard University
 Surgeon (Doctor of Medicine from La Salle University and the National Autonomous University of Mexico

Gasman is of Mexican and French nationality.

Career 

Gasman has worked in public policy to help women and promote human rights and intercultural understanding for over 30 years. Nadine Gasman has worked in Brazil, Guatemala, and Mexico to address gender inequalities and violence against women, among other human rights violations. She also works with indigenous women, women of African descent, and young people.

From 2005 to 2010 she was the representative in Guatemala of the UN Population Fund (UNFPA). From 2010 to 2013, she was senior director in Latin America and the Caribbean for the UNiTE to End Violence against Women campaign organized by the UN Secretary-General. She represented UN Women in Brazil from 2013, in which role she presented a set of goals such as the doubling female access to the Internet and challenged the Brazilian Ministry of Women, Family and Human Rights for declining to participate in the form.

She advocates for expanded access to legal abortion in Mexico and helped strengthen 911 services to guard against an increase in domestic violence during quarantines for the COVID-19 pandemic.

She was also the founder and general director of consulting company Latin American Health Group, where she worked with organizations including the World Health Organization (WHO), Pan American Health Organization (PAHO), the World Bank, and the aid agencies United States Agency for International Development (USAID), Danish International Development Agency (DANIDA), and Swedish International Development Cooperation Agency (SIDA), and the European Commission.

References

External links 
 Biography at the Government of Mexico

Living people
Mexican women activists
Mexican women physicians
National Autonomous University of Mexico alumni
Johns Hopkins Bloomberg School of Public Health alumni
Harvard School of Public Health alumni
Year of birth missing (living people)